The following outline is provided as an overview of and topical guide to South Africa:

South Africa – A sovereign country located at the southern tip of Africa.  South Africa's coast stretches 2,798 kilometres and borders both the Atlantic and Indian oceans. To the north of South Africa lie Namibia, Botswana, Zimbabwe, Mozambique and Eswatini (formerly Swaziland), while the Kingdom of Lesotho is an independent enclave surrounded by South African territory.

General reference 

 Pronunciation: 
 Common English country name:  South Africa
 Official English country name:  The Republic of South Africa
 Common endonym(s): Aforika Borwa, Afrika Borwa, Afrika-Dzonga, Afurika Tshipembe, iNingizimu Afrika, iSewula Afrika, South Africa, Suid-Afrika, uMzantsi Afrika
 Official endonym(s): iRiphabhulikhi yeNingizimu Afrika, iRiphabhuliki yaseNingizimu Afrika, iRiphabliki yeSewula Afrika, iRiphabliki yomZantsi Afrika, Repabliki ya Afrika-Borwa, Rephaboliki ya Aforika Borwa, Rephaboliki ya Afrika Borwa, Republic of South Africa, Republiek van Suid-Afrika, Riphabliki ra Afrika Dzonga, Riphabuḽiki ya Afurika Tshipembe
 Adjectival(s): South African
 Demonym(s): South Africans
 ISO country codes:  ZA, ZAF, 710
 ISO region codes:  See ISO 3166-2:ZA
 Internet country code top-level domain:  .za

Geography of South Africa 

Geography of South Africa
 South Africa is: a megadiverse country
 Location:
 Eastern Hemisphere and Southern Hemisphere
 Africa
 Southern Africa
 Time zone:  South African Standard Time (UTC+02)
 Extreme points of South Africa
 High:  Mafadi 
 Low:  South Atlantic Ocean and Indian Ocean 0 m
 Land boundaries:  4,862 km
 1,840 km
 967 km
 909 km
 491 km
 430 km
 225 km
 Coastline:  2,798 km
 Population of South Africa: 57,725,600 (July 2018 estimate)  - 26th most populous country

 Area of South Africa: 1 221 037 km2
 Atlas of South Africa

Environment of South Africa 

 Climate of South Africa
 Geology of South Africa
 Marine geology of the Cape Peninsula and False Bay
 Green building in South Africa
 Ecoregions in South Africa
 Renewable energy in South Africa
 Protected areas of South Africa
 Biosphere reserves in South Africa
 National parks of South Africa
 Wildlife of South Africa
 Flora of South Africa
 List of Southern African indigenous trees
 Fynbos
 King protea
 Veld
 Clanwilliam cedar
 Real yellowwood, the national tree
 Rooibos
 Fauna of South Africa
 Birds of South Africa
 Mammals of South Africa

Natural geographic features of South Africa 

 Glaciers in South Africa: none 
 Cape of Good Hope
 Deserts of South Africa
 Kalahari Desert
 Estuaries of South Africa
 Islands of South Africa
 Forests of South Africa
 Lakes of South Africa
 Mountains of South Africa
 Mountain ranges of South Africa
 Mountain passes of South Africa
 Specific mountains
 Table Mountain
 Volcanoes in South Africa
 Rivers of South Africa
 Fish River
 Orange River
 Tugela River
 Waterfalls of South Africa
 Tugela Falls
 World Heritage Sites in South Africa

Regions of South Africa

Administrative divisions of South Africa 

Administrative divisions of South Africa
 Provinces of South Africa
 Districts of South Africa
 Municipalities of South Africa

Provinces of South Africa 

Provinces of South Africa
Western Cape
Northern Cape
Eastern Cape
KwaZulu-Natal
Free State
North West
Gauteng
Mpumalanga
Limpopo

Districts of South Africa 

Districts of South Africa
 City of Cape Town Metropolitan Municipality
 West Coast
 Cape Winelands
 Overberg
 Garden Route
 Central Karoo
 Nelson Mandela Bay Metropolitan Municipality
 Cacadu
 Amathole
 Chris Hani
 Joe Gqabi
 OR Tambo
 Alfred Nzo
 Xhariep
 Motheo
 Lejweleputswa
 Thabo Mofutsanyane
 Northern Free State
 Namakwa
 Pixley ka Seme
 Siyanda
 Frances Baard
 Kgalagadi
 Bojanala Platinum
 Ngaka Modiri Molema
 Dr Ruth Segomotsi Mompati
 Dr Kenneth Kaunda
 West Rand
 City of Johannesburg Metropolitan Municipality
 Sedibeng
 Ekurhuleni Metropolitan Municipality
 Metsweding
 City of Tshwane Metropolitan Municipality
 Mopani
 Vhembe
 Capricorn
 Waterberg
 Sekhukhune
 Gert Sibande
 Nkangala
 Ehlanzeni
 Amajuba
 Zululand
 Umkhanyakude
 uThungulu
 Umzinyathi
 Uthukela
 Umgungundlovu
 iLembe
 eThekwini Metropolitan Municipality
 Ugu
 Sisonke

Municipalities of South Africa 

Municipalities of South Africa
 Capital of South Africa: Pretoria (executive), Bloemfontein (judicial) and Cape Town (legislative)
 Cities of South Africa
 Populated places in South Africa

Demography of South Africa 

Demographics of South Africa

Government and politics of South Africa 

Politics of South Africa
 Form of government: unitary parliamentary representative democratic republic
 Capital of South Africa: Pretoria (executive), Bloemfontein (judicial) and Cape Town (legislative)
 Elections in South Africa
 Political parties in South Africa
 Social movements in South Africa
 Taxation in South Africa

Branches of the government of South Africa 

Government of South Africa

Executive branch of the government of South Africa 
Head of state and head of government: President of South Africa, Cyril Ramaphosa
Cabinet of South Africa

Legislative branch of the government of South Africa 

 Parliament of South Africa (bicameral)
 Upper house: National Council of Provinces
 Lower house: National Assembly of South Africa

Judicial branch of the government of South Africa 

 Constitutional Court of South Africa
 Chief Justice of South Africa
 Supreme Court of Appeal of South Africa
 High Court of South Africa
 Magistrates' Courts of South Africa

Foreign relations of South Africa 

Foreign relations of South Africa
 Diplomatic missions in South Africa
 Diplomatic missions of South Africa
 Immigration to South Africa

International organization membership 
The Republic of South Africa is a member of:

African, Caribbean, and Pacific Group of States (ACP)
African Development Bank Group (AfDB)
African Union (AU)
African Union/United Nations Hybrid operation in Darfur (UNAMID)
Bank for International Settlements (BIS)
Commonwealth of Nations
Food and Agriculture Organization (FAO)
Group of 24 (G24)
Group of 77 (G77)
Group of Twenty Finance Ministers and Central Bank Governors (G20)
International Atomic Energy Agency (IAEA)
International Bank for Reconstruction and Development (IBRD)
International Chamber of Commerce (ICC)
International Civil Aviation Organization (ICAO)
International Criminal Court (ICCt)
International Criminal Police Organization (Interpol)
International Development Association (IDA)
International Federation of Red Cross and Red Crescent Societies (IFRCS)
International Finance Corporation (IFC)
International Fund for Agricultural Development (IFAD)
International Hydrographic Organization (IHO)
International Labour Organization (ILO)
International Maritime Organization (IMO)
International Mobile Satellite Organization (IMSO)
International Monetary Fund (IMF)
International Olympic Committee (IOC)
International Organization for Migration (IOM)
International Organization for Standardization (ISO)
International Red Cross and Red Crescent Movement (ICRM)

International Telecommunication Union (ITU)
International Telecommunications Satellite Organization (ITSO)
International Trade Union Confederation (ITUC)
Inter-Parliamentary Union (IPU)
Multilateral Investment Guarantee Agency (MIGA)
Nonaligned Movement (NAM)
Nuclear Suppliers Group (NSG)
Organisation for the Prohibition of Chemical Weapons (OPCW)
Permanent Court of Arbitration (PCA)
Southern African Customs Union (SACU)
Southern African Development Community (SADC)
United Nations (UN)
United Nations Conference on Trade and Development (UNCTAD)
United Nations Educational, Scientific, and Cultural Organization (UNESCO)
United Nations High Commissioner for Refugees (UNHCR)
United Nations Industrial Development Organization (UNIDO)
United Nations Institute for Training and Research (UNITAR)
United Nations Organization Mission in the Democratic Republic of the Congo (MONUC)
Universal Postal Union (UPU)
World Confederation of Labour (WCL)
World Customs Organization (WCO)
World Federation of Trade Unions (WFTU)
World Health Organization (WHO)
World Intellectual Property Organization (WIPO)
World Meteorological Organization (WMO)
World Organization of the Scout Movement
World Tourism Organization (UNWTO)
World Trade Organization (WTO)
World Veterans Federation
Zangger Committee (ZC)

Law and order in South Africa 

Law of South Africa
 Cannabis in South Africa
 Constitution of South Africa
 Crime in South Africa
 Sexual violence in South Africa
 Human rights in South Africa
 LGBT rights in South Africa
 Freedom of religion in South Africa
 South African nationality law

Law enforcement in South Africa 
Law enforcement in South Africa
 Department of Police
 South African Police Service
 Crime Intelligence (SAPS)
 South African Police Service Special Task Force
 National Intervention Unit 
 Directorate for Priority Crime Investigation ( SAPS )
 National Forensic DNA Database of South Africa
 Municipal Police
 Provincial Traffic Department 
 Reaction Units South Africa 
 Independent Complaints Directorate
 Department of Correctional Services
 Capital punishment in South Africa
 Biometrics use by the South African government

Military of South Africa 

Military of South Africa
 Command
 Commander-in-chief: President of South Africa
 Minister of Defence of South Africa
 Department of Defence of South Africa
 South African National Defence Force
 South African Air Force
 South African Army
 South African Navy
 South African Military Health Service
 South African Special Forces Brigade
 South African Commando System
 South African National Defence Force Intelligence Division
 Military history of South Africa
 Military ranks of South Africa

State security in South Africa 

 State Security Agency
 Minister
 National Intelligence Co-ordinating Committee (NICC)
 National Intelligence Agency (NIA)
 National Communications Centre (NCC)
 Communications security (COMSEC)
 South African Secret Service (SASS)
 South African National Academy of Intelligence (SANAI)

Local government in South Africa 

Local government in South Africa

History of South Africa 
History of South Africa
 South African History Project

Books on the history of South Africa 
 The Cambridge History of South Africa
 The Oxford History of South Africa

History of South Africa, by period 
 List of years in South Africa
 Early history of South Africa
 Jan van Riebeeck
 Xhosa Wars
 Mfecane
 Great Trek
 Zulu War (see also Anglo-Zulu War)
 History of Cape Colony
 History of Cape Colony before 1806
 Orange Free State
 South African Republic
 Boer Wars
 First Boer War
 Second Boer War
 Pretoria Convention
 Great Depression in South Africa
 Military history of South Africa during World War II
 Apartheid
 History of apartheid
 Sharpeville massacre
 Rivonia Trial
 Crime of Apartheid Convention (1973)
 Other events related to apartheid
 South African Border War
 History of South Africa since 1994

History of South Africa, by region 

 History of Johannesburg

History of South Africa, by subject 

 History of the Cabinet of South Africa
 Earthquakes in South Africa
 Economic history of South Africa
 South African hacker history
 History of the Jews in South Africa
 LGBT history in South Africa
 Timeline of LGBT history in South Africa
 History of libraries in South Africa
 South African locomotive history
 Military history of South Africa
 History of the South African Air Force
 Military history of South Africa during World War II
 History of South African nationality
 Postage stamps and postal history of South Africa
 Social movements in South Africa
 History of South African wine
 History of women's rights in South Africa

Culture of South Africa 

Culture of South Africa
 Architecture of South Africa
Cape Dutch architecture
 Cuisine of South Africa
 South African wine
 Feminism in South Africa
 Gambling in South Africa
 South African heraldry
 Media in South Africa
 National symbols of South Africa
 Coat of arms of South Africa
 Flag of South Africa
 National anthem of South Africa
 National flower of South Africa
 Prostitution in South Africa
 Public holidays in South Africa
 Racism in South Africa
 Scouts South Africa
 World Heritage Sites in South Africa
 Xenophobia in South Africa

 Afrikaner Calvinism
 Kwaito
 Ladysmith Black Mambazo
 Nguni stick fighting
 Khoikhoi mythology

Art in South Africa 

 Architecture of South Africa
 Art of South Africa
 List of South African artists
 Cinema of South Africa
 Literature of South Africa
 List of South African poets
 List of Afrikaans language poets
 Media in South Africa
 Music of South Africa
 Television in South Africa

Language in South Africa 

 Click consonant
 Languages of South Africa
 Afrikaans language
 English language (South African English)
 Nguni languages
 Southern Ndebele language (isiNdebele)
 Swati language (siSwati)
 Xhosa language (isiXhosa)
 Zulu language (isiZulu)
 Sotho languages
 Sotho language (Sesotho)
 Northern Sotho language (Sesotho sa Leboa)
 Tswana language (Setswana)
 Venda language (Tshivenda)
 Tsonga language (Xitsonga)
 !Xu language
 Bantu languages
 Khoisan languages
 List of South African slang words

People of South Africa 

People of South Africa
 Ethnic groups in South Africa
 Asian South African
 Indian South African
 Chinese South African
 Bantu peoples
 Basotho
 Bakoena
 Bataung
 Batlokoa
 South Ndebele people
 Pedi people
 Sotho people
 Swazi people
 Tsonga people
 Tswana people
 Venda people
 Venda
 Xhosa people
 Zulu people
 Coloureds
 Cape Coloured
 Cape Malay
 Griqua people
 Khoisan
 White South African
 Afrikaner
 British diaspora in South Africa
 Jewish South Africans
 Homeless in South Africa

Specific persons 

 Neil Aggett
 Tatamkulu Afrika
 Autshumao
 Steve Biko
 Arthur Blaxall
 Pieter Willem Botha
 J. M. Coetzee
 Mahatma Gandhi
 Frederik Willem de Klerk
 Krotoa
 Paul Kruger
 Winnie Madikizela-Mandela
 Nelson Mandela
 Mark Mathabane
 Govan Mbeki
 Thabo Mbeki
 Lilian Ngoyi
 Raymond Mhlaba
 Patrice Motsepe
 Harry Oppenheimer
 Jan van Riebeeck
 Charles Robberts Swart
 Shaka Zulu
 Walter Sisulu
 J.G. Strijdom
 Charles Robberts Swart
 Oliver Tambo
 Desmond Tutu
 B.J. Vorster
 J.R.R. Tolkien
 Jacob Zuma

Religion in South Africa 

Religion in South Africa
 Buddhism in South Africa
 Christianity in South Africa
 Roman Catholicism in South Africa
 Protestantism in South Africa
 Hinduism in South Africa
 Islam in South Africa
 Judaism in South Africa

Sports in South Africa 

Sport in South Africa
 Cape Unicorns Polocrosse Club
 Football in South Africa
 Cricket in South Africa
 History of cricket in South Africa
 History of cricket in South Africa to 1918
 History of cricket in South Africa from 1918–19 to 1945
 History of cricket in South Africa from 1945–46 to 1970
 History of cricket in South Africa from 1970–71 to 1990
 History of cricket in South Africa from 1990–91 to 2000
 History of cricket in South Africa from 2000–01
 South Africa at the Olympics
 Weskus Marathon

Rugby in South Africa 

 South Africa at the Rugby World Cup
 South African Rugby Board
 South African Rugby Legends Association
 South African Rugby Football Federation
 Rugby league in South Africa
 South African Rugby League
 South Africa national rugby league team
 History of rugby league in South Africa
 History of the South Africa national rugby league team
 Rugby sevens in South Africa
 South Africa national rugby sevens team
 List of South Africa national rugby sevens players
 South Africa women's national rugby sevens team
 South Africa at the World Rugby Sevens Series
 Rugby union in South Africa
 South African Rugby Union
 South African rugby union captains
 List of South Africa national rugby union players
 South African rugby union teams
 South Africa national rugby union team
 South Africa national rugby union team players
 List of South Africa national rugby union team records
 South Africa national under-18 rugby union team
 South Africa national under-20 rugby union team
 List of South Africa national under-20 rugby union team players
 South Africa 'A' national rugby union team
 South Africa amateur national rugby union team
 South African Universities rugby union team
 South Africa women's national rugby union team
 History of rugby union in South Africa
 History of the South Africa national rugby union team
 History of rugby union matches between Argentina and South Africa
 History of rugby union matches between Australia and South Africa
 History of rugby union matches between England and South Africa
 History of rugby union matches between France and South Africa
 History of rugby union matches between Ireland and South Africa
 History of rugby union matches between Italy and South Africa
 History of rugby union matches between New Zealand and South Africa
 History of rugby union matches between Samoa and South Africa
 History of rugby union matches between Scotland and South Africa
 History of rugby union matches between South Africa and Wales
 History of rugby union matches between South Africa and the Barbarians
 History of rugby union matches between South Africa and the British & Irish Lions

Economy and infrastructure of South Africa 

Economy of South Africa
 Economic rank, by nominal GDP (2007): 30th (thirtieth)
 Agriculture in South Africa
 Banking in South Africa
 South African Reserve Bank
 Communications in South Africa
 Media in South Africa
 Telecommunications in South Africa
 Internet in South Africa
 Television in South Africa
 List of radio stations in South Africa
 South African Broadcasting Corporation (SABC)
 Companies of South Africa
Currency of South Africa: Rand
Financial rand (abolished)
ISO 4217: ZAR
 Economic history of South Africa
 Energy in South Africa
 Foreign trade of South Africa
 Gambling in South Africa
 Housing in South Africa
 Homelessness in South Africa
 Mining in South Africa
 Iron ore in South Africa
 Platinum in South Africa
 Titanium in South Africa
 Johannesburg Stock Exchange
 Taxation in South Africa
 Tourism in South Africa
 Trade unions in South Africa
 Transport in South Africa
 Airports in South Africa
 Rail transport in South Africa
 Water supply and sanitation in South Africa

Companies in South Africa 

 Anglo American
 BHP
 Eskom
 Etruscan Resources
 Kumba Resources
 List of radio stations in South Africa
 Murray & Roberts
 Mvelaphanda Group
 Richards Bay Minerals RBM
 Sasol
 South African Airways (SAA)
 Standard Bank of South Africa
 Telkom (South Africa)
 Transnet
 Blue Train (South Africa)
 Freightdynamics
 Petronet
 Protekon
 Shosholoza Meyl
 South African Port Operations SAPO
 Transnet Engineering
 Transnet Freight Rail

Education in South Africa 

Education in South Africa
List of universities in South Africa
University of the Witwatersrand
University of the Western Cape
University of KwaZulu-Natal
University of Johannesburg
University of Fort Hare
University of Cape Town
University of South Africa
University of Zululand
University of Pretoria
University of Stellenbosch
Rhodes University
North-West University
National Qualifications Framework
South African Qualifications Authority

Health in South Africa 

 Health in South Africa
 Healthcare in South Africa
 Midwives in South Africa
 HIV/AIDS in South Africa

See also 

South Africa

List of international rankings
Member state of the Commonwealth of Nations
Member state of the Group of Twenty Finance Ministers and Central Bank Governors
Member state of the United Nations
Outline of Africa
Outline of geography

References

External links 

Government of South Africa
SouthAfrica.info

South Africa. The World Factbook. Central Intelligence Agency.

South Africa
South Africa